Nilokheri is a town, just 19 km from Karnal city and a municipal committee in Karnal district in the Indian state of Haryana. It has 13 wards. The town is located about 143 km from Delhi on National Highway 1.

Demographics
 India census, Nilokheri had a population of 16,405. Males constitute 52% of the population and females 48%. Nilokheri has an average literacy rate of 73%, higher than the national average of 59.5%: male literacy is 77%, and female literacy is 69%. In Nilokheri, 13% of the population is under 6 years of age.

Administration
Nilokheri is a town and a municipal committee in Karnal district in the Indian state of Haryana . Nilokheri has a polling strength of 12517.

Educational institutions

Academic Technical Learning Institute

 Guru BrahamaNand Ji Govt. Polytechnic Institute Nilokheri
 State Institute of Engineering & Technology, Nilokheri 
 Central Tool Room Extension Centre, Nilokheri earlier functional as Integrated Training Centre, Nilokheri now affiliated to  Ministry of Micro, Small and Medium Enterprises
 Kalpana Chawla Government Medical College, Karnal
 Kalpana Chawla University of Health Sciences, Karnal
 National Dairy Research Institute, Karnal
 Govt. Polytechnic, Umri
 Kurukshetra University, Kurukshetra
 National Institute of Technology, Kurukshetra
 National Institute of Design, Kurukshetra
 National Institute of Electronics & Information Technology, Kurukshetra

Other Government offices, institutions and organisations

Government Organisation
 Government of India Press, Nilokheri.
 Post Office Nilokheri (Sub Office), Karnal, Haryana HR), India (IN), Pin Code:- 132117.
BSNL, Nilokheri (Sub Office ) state-owned telecommunications company .
 Agro Engineering Workshop, Nilokheri was set up in 1968-1969. It is a unit of Haryana Agro Industries Corporation Limited (A Government of Haryana Undertaking).
 Haryana State Cooperative Supply and Marketing Federation Ltd (HAFED) was set up on 1 November 1966. One of the largest apex cooperative federation of  Government of Haryana.

Primary and secondary schools

Govt. Schools
 Government Senior Secondary School, Nilokheri affiliated to Haryana Board of School Education Bhiwani,

Pvt. Schools
 D.A.V. Centenary Public School, Nilokheri affiliated to Central Board of Secondary Education
 Meera Bai School affiliated to Haryana Board of School Education Bhiwani
 S.D.M.N. Vidya Mandir Sr. Secondary School affiliated to Central Board of Secondary Education

Geography
It has an average elevation of 237 metres (830 feet).

References

External links 
 
 Department of Technical Education, Haryana

 
Cities and towns in Karnal district
1947 establishments in India
Karnal